ICON is the name of at least five science fiction conventions:

 ICON (Iowa science fiction convention) is held in the Cedar Rapids/Iowa City area since 1975, usually in late October or early November, under the auspices of the Mindbridge Foundation, a not-for-profit foundation which also sponsors the Gamicon and AnimeIowa conventions.
 I-CON is held in Stony Brook, New York, every spring, on the campus of Stony Brook University since 1981. I-CON (with a hyphen) is short for Island  Convention – a reference to its location on Long Island.
 ICon festival is the main Israeli annual science fiction, fantasy and role-playing convention (now officially a festival) – standing for Israeli Convention. It has been held in Tel Aviv annually since 1996 during Sukkot.
 Icon was the name of the 2005 National Science Fiction Convention in New Zealand.
 iCON is an annual science fiction, fantasy and role-playing convention in Turkey, Istanbul held by the Science Fiction and Fantasy Club of Istanbul University.

External links
 Iowa Icon home page
 New York I-CON home page
 Israeli ICon home page
 New Zealand Icon home page
 İstanbul CON- iCON home page

Lists of events